Rostaq Rural District is a rural district (dehestan) in Rostaq District, Darab County, Fars Province, Iran. At the 2006 census, its population was 9,171, in 2,206 families.  The rural district has 34 villages.

References 

Rural Districts of Fars Province
Darab County